Alfredo Ángel Romano (2 August 1893 – 22 August 1972) was a Uruguayan professional footballer. A striker, he played 70 games for his national team between 1911 and 1927, scoring 28 goals. He played in the Copa América nine times, winning the title a record six times, losing one final and finishing third twice. He was also part of the Uruguay national team that won the football tournament in the 1924 Olympics.

Romano played club football for Nacional between 1910 and 1930, scoring 164 goals in 388 games. The club won 22 titles during his time as a player. He won a total of 32 official titles in his career, 46 including the friendly tournaments. He retired at the age of 37.

Honours

Club 

CURCC
 Primera División: 1911
 Copa de Honor: 1911
 Copa de Honor Cousenier: 1911

Nacional
 Primera División: 1915, 1916, 1917, 1919, 1920, 1922, 1923 (AUF), 1924 (AUF)
 Copa de Honor: 1915, 1916, 1917
 Copa de Competencia: 1915, 1919, 1921, 1923
 Tie Cup: 1915
 Copa de Honor Cousenier: 1915, 1916, 1917
 Copa Aldao: 1916, 1919, 1920

National team 
Uruguay
 Copa América: 1916, 1917, 1920, 1923, 1924, 1926
 Summer Olympics Gold Medal: 1924
 Copa Lipton (friendly): 1911, 1912, 1919, 1922, 1923
 Copa Newton (friendly): 1912, 1917, 1919, 1920
 Copa Premier Honor Uruguayo (friendly): 1911, 1912, 1918, 1919, 1920

References

External links 

 Profile

1893 births
1972 deaths
Association football forwards
Boca Juniors footballers
Club Nacional de Football players
Uruguayan Primera División players
Copa América-winning players
Footballers at the 1924 Summer Olympics
Medalists at the 1924 Summer Olympics
Olympic footballers of Uruguay
Olympic gold medalists for Uruguay
Olympic medalists in football
Uruguayan footballers
Uruguay international footballers